Gerrit Postma (25 December 1894 – 3 November 1969) was a Dutch athlete. He competed in the men's discus throw at the 1928 Summer Olympics.

References

External links
 

1894 births
1969 deaths
Athletes (track and field) at the 1928 Summer Olympics
Dutch male discus throwers
Olympic athletes of the Netherlands
People from Westerveld
Sportspeople from Drenthe